Pteraster is a genus of sea stars in the family Pterasteridae.

Species
The following species are listed in the World Register of Marine Species:

 Pteraster abyssorum (Verrill, 1895)
 Pteraster acicula (Downey, 1970)
 Pteraster affinis Smith, 1876
 Pteraster alveolatus Perrier, 1894
 Pteraster bathami Fell, 1958
 Pteraster capensis Gray, 1847
 Pteraster caribbaeus Perrier, 1881
 Pteraster corynetes Fisher, 1916
 Pteraster coscinopeplus Fisher, 1910
 Pteraster diaphanus (Ludwig, 1905)
 Pteraster educator Djakonov, 1958
 Pteraster flabellifer Mortensen, 1933
 Pteraster florifer Koehler, 1920
 Pteraster fornicatus Mortensen, 1933
 Pteraster gibber (Sladen, 1882)
 Pteraster hastatus Mortensen, 1913
 Pteraster hirsutus (Sladen, 1882)
 Pteraster hymenasteroides Djakonov, 1958
 Pteraster hystrix Harvey, 1989
 Pteraster ifurus Golotsvan, 1998
 Pteraster inermis Perrier, 1888
 Pteraster jordani Fisher, 1905
 Pteraster koehleri A.M. Clark, 1962
 Pteraster marsippus Fisher, 1910
 Pteraster militarioides H.L. Clark, 1941
 Pteraster militaris (O.F. Müller, 1776)
 Pteraster minutus Djakonov, 1958
 Pteraster multiporus H.L. Clark, 1908
 Pteraster obesus H.L. Clark, 1908
 Pteraster obscurus (Perrier, 1891)
 Pteraster octaster Verrill, 1909
 Pteraster personatus Sladen, 1891
 Pteraster pulvillus (M. Sars, 1861)
 Pteraster reticulatus Fisher, 1906
 Pteraster robertsoni McKnight, 1973
 Pteraster rugatus Sladen, 1882
 Pteraster rugosus H.L. Clark, 1941
 Pteraster solitarius Djakonov, 1958
 Pteraster spinosissimus (Sladen, 1882)
 Pteraster stellifer Sladen, 1882
 Pteraster temnochiton Fisher, 1910
 Pteraster tesselatus Ives, 1888
 Pteraster tetracanthus H.L. Clark, 1916
 Pteraster texius Golotsvan, 1998
 Pteraster trigonodon Domantay, 1969
 Pteraster trigonodon Fisher, 1910
 Pteraster uragensis Hayashi, 1940
 Pteraster willsi Clark & Jewett, 2011

References

Pteraster